Jia, King of Zhao (趙王嘉, reigned 227–223 BCE), also known as Jia, King of Dai (代王嘉), Zhao Jia (趙嘉), was the last ruler of the state of Zhao during the waning days of the Warring States Period of Chinese history. His realm was a rump state that covered only a northern fraction of the former Zhao territories.

Name
The title  was held by the paramount leaders of Shang and Zhou-era China and is usually translated into English as "king". Under the Han and later Chinese dynasties, however, it was also used for appanages of the imperial families who had no independent sovereignty of their own. In such contexts, it is more common to translate the title as "prince". Sima Qian lists Jia as a lesser lord in his treatment of the state of Zhao, but still describes him as an independent king rather than reducing his rank.

Life

Zhao Jia was the eldest son of King Daoxiang of Zhao, but was passed over in succession in favor of his younger brother (who became known as King Youmiu) because of the machinations of the boy's mother, the concubine Zhao Mianchang.

Qin forces captured the Zhao capital of Handan in 228 BCE and captured King Youmiu. It is likely that Zhao Jia was not in Handan at the time, for shortly afterwards he led several hundred clan members towards Dai Commandery, whose seat was southwest of present-day Yuxian in Hebei. This controlled the northeastern quarter of the Zhao kingdom. There, having been proclaimed King by his courtiers, King Jia allied himself with King Xi of Yan against Qin forces, which were poised to invade Yan after Jing Ke's failed assassination attempt on King Zheng of Qin.

At the Battle of Yi River in 226 BCE, the combined forces of Yan and Jia's Kingdom of Dai were defeated by Qin forces, with King Xi of Yan fleeing to Liaodong. Seeing this, King Jia urged King Xi to kill Jing Ke's patron, Prince Dan of Yan, in an attempt to appease the King of Qin. This, combined with the commencement of Qin wars against Wei and Chu, delayed the conquest of Dai for some years.

Ultimately, in 223 BCE, Qin forces under Wang Ben conquered the rump Yan state in Liaodong. On their way back to Central China, they conquered Dai as well. King Jia was taken prisoner, thus extinguishing the last remnant of the Zhao state.

It is unlikely that King Jia was treated too harshly, as his son was sent by the Qin court as an emissary to the Xirong. The descendants of Zhao settled in Tianshui in modern-day Gansu.

Legacy
The site of the ancient city of Dai is now preserved in Yu County, Hebei, under the name "Dai King City" (代王城) in Zhao Jia's honor. He was also seen in Manga Kingdom.

See also
 King of Dai
 Kingdom of Dai during the Warring States
 Other Dai states in Chinese history

References

Citations

Bibliography
 

Monarchs of Zhao (state)
Year of death unknown
Zhou dynasty nobility
3rd-century BC Chinese monarchs
Zhao (state)
250s BC births